Ron Davies, OBE (17 December 1921 – 26 October 2013) was a Welsh photographer.

Life and work
Davies was born in Aberaeron, Wales. He developed an interest in photography at the age of 8, while working as an errand boy for a chemist shop in his home town.

During WWII, Davies became an official war photographer on the staff of Air Information with the South East Asia command of the Royal Air Force, stationed in India, the Dutch East Indies and British Malaya. In 1950, Davies was injured in an accident on his motorcycle combination, and consequently used a wheelchair for the rest of his life, though this didn't prevent him pursuing his chosen career.

He worked as a still and cine press photographer for HTV, the BBC, the Western Mail, Y Cymro and various national newspapers, and produced much private work and mounted many exhibitions. He also took a keen and active interest in teaching photography, and was the driving force behind the first mobile disabled darkroom, operated by Arts Care/Gofal Celf.

In 2003, Davies was awarded the OBE for his services to photography, and the year before he was accepted into the Welsh National Eisteddfod's Bardic Circle.

Davies died on 26 October 2013, aged 91.

Publications
 Llun A Chân, 1983, 
 24 Awr Bronglais: Bywyd mewn diwrnod, Bronglais: 24 hours – A life in the day of, 1988, exhibition catalogue
 Delweddau O Gymru/Images Of Wales, 1990, 
 The Seven Wonders of Wales, 1993, 
 Byd Ron/Ron's World, 2001,

References

External links
 Ron snaps up OBE BBC News, 31 December 2003.
 Ron's World—a collection of photographs by Ron Davies at Wales Online, 16 April 2002.

1921 births
2013 deaths
Officers of the Order of the British Empire
People from Aberaeron
War photographers
Welsh photographers
British people in colonial India
British people in British Malaya
British expatriates in the Dutch East Indies